Stephen Michael Decker (born October 25, 1965) is an American former professional baseball catcher.

Coaching career
Decker began his coaching career as a hitting coach for the Salem-Keizer Volcanoes in 2001–02 and the Fresno Grizzlies in 2003–04.  He then managed for Salem-Keizer (2005–07), the San Jose Giants (2008), the Connecticut Defenders (2009), and the Fresno Grizzlies (2010–11).  

In 2012, he swapped positions with Bob Mariano, who replaced him as the Grizzlies' manager, and became coordinator of minor-league hitting instruction for the Giants. In 2015, he took his first major league coaching position as assistant hitting coach for the San Francisco Giants.

Personal life
Decker is married with two daughters and resides in Keizer, Oregon.

References

External links

1965 births
Living people
American expatriate baseball players in Canada
Anaheim Angels players
Baseball coaches from Illinois
Baseball players from Illinois
Colorado Rockies players
Colorado Springs Sky Sox players
Edmonton Trappers players
Everett Giants players
Florida Marlins players
Houston Cougars baseball players
Lewis–Clark State Warriors baseball players
Major League Baseball catchers
Major League Baseball hitting coaches
Minor league baseball managers
Nashville Sounds players
Norfolk Tides players
Phoenix Firebirds players
Sacramento River Cats players
Salem-Keizer Volcanoes
San Francisco Giants coaches
San Francisco Giants players
San Francisco Giants scouts
San Jose Giants players
Shreveport Captains players
Sportspeople from Rock Island, Illinois
Tacoma Rainiers players